Ozar, Madhya Pradesh is a village in Rajpur tehsil of Barwani district in the Indian state of Madhya Pradesh.

Geography

Demographics

As of the 2011 Census of India, Ozar had a population of 6,902. Males constitute 51% of the population and females 49%. Ozar has an average literacy rate of 62%, higher than the national average of 59.5%: male literacy is 56%, and female literacy is 44%. In Ozar, 15% of the population is under 6 years of age.

References

External links
 Barwani District

Villages in Barwani district
Barwani district